The 1999–2000 Pro Tour season was the fifth season of the Magic: The Gathering Pro Tour. It began on 3 September 1999 with Pro Tour Boston and ended on 6 August 2000 with the conclusion of 2000 World Championship in Brussels. The season consisted of twenty Grand Prixs, and six Pro Tours, located in Washington D.C., London, Chicago, Los Angeles, New York, and Brussels. At the end of the season Bob Maher, Jr. was awarded the Pro Player of the year title.

Mode 

Six Pro Tours and 20 Grand Prix were held in the 1999–2000 season. Based on final standings Pro Points were awarded as follows:

Pro Tour – Washington D.C. (3–5 September 1999) 

Washington D.C. was the first team Pro Tour. In a high-profile Top 8 featuring six players who were later inducted into the Hall of Fame, team Your Move Games (YMG) came out on top. YMG consisted of Dave Humpherys, Rob Dougherty, and Darwin Kastle, all eventual members of the Hall of Fame.

Tournament data 

Players: 243 (81 teams)
Prize Pool: $100,230
Format: Urza's Saga Team Sealed (Urza's Saga, Urza's Legacy, Urza's Destiny) – first day, Urza's Saga Team Rochester Draft (Urza's Saga-Urza's Legacy-Urza's Destiny) – final two days
Head Judge: Mike Guptil

Top 8

Final standings

Grand Prixs – Tohoku, Memphis, Lisbon 

GP Tohoku (11–12 September)
 Higashino Masayuki
 Kazuyuki Momose
 Satoshi Nakamura
 Itaru Ishida
 Toshiki Tsukamoto
 Ayumi Hidaka
 Hiroshi Harada
 Yuichi Taguchi

GP Memphis (18–19 September)
 Michael Pustilnik
 Mike Heffern
 Kyle Kloeckner
 Matthew Norton
 Adrian Sullivan
 David Jafari
 Ric Watts
 Matt Rauseo

GP Lisbon (25–26 September)
 Helder Coelho
 Paolo Cruz
 Stephane Gentric
 Rui Mariani
 Pedro Marcos
 Alex Shvartsman
 Kuniyoshi Ishii
 Hector Fuentes

Pro Tour – London (15–17 October 1999) 

Kyle Rose won Pro Tour London, defeating Austrian Thomas Preyer in the finals. Darwin Kastle's back to back Top 8 appearances in Washington and London brought him to five final day appearance in his career.

Tournament data 

Players: 310
Prize pool: $151,635
Format: Urza's Saga Booster Draft (Urza's Saga-Urza's Legacy-Urza's Destiny)
Head Judge: Carl Crook

Top 8

Final standings

Grand Prixs – Kyushu, Sao Paulo, Milan, San Diego, Tours 

GP Kyushu (30–31 October)
 Tadayoshi Komiya
 Eisaku Itadani
 Katsuhiro Mori
 Fumihiko Sano
 Masashiro Kuroda
 Masayuki Higashino
 Takuichi Harino
 Toshiki Tsukamoto

GP San Diego (20–21 November)
 William Jensen
 Gary Krakower
 David Williams
 Charles Kornblith
 Darwin Kastle
 John Yoo
 Trevor Blackwell
 Eric James

GP São Paulo (6–7 November)
 Rafael Assafi Alvarengi
 Douglas Maioli
 Carlos Mao
 Alex Shvartsman
 Carlos Romão
 Eduardo Simao Teixeira
 F. Moreira Bandeira
 Rodrigo Jose Constanza

GP Tours (27–28 November)
 Alex Shvartsman
 Nicolas Labarre
 Eric Vinh
 Franck Canu
 Christer Ljones
 Camille Gleizes
 Thomas F. Gundersen
 Svend Geertsen

GP Milan (6–7 November)
 Ziga Fritz
 Raphael Gennari
 William Cavaglieri
 Mario Delucis
 Ivan Solaja
 Micha Schulte-Middelich
 Ivan Curina
 Sasa Zorc

Pro Tour – Chicago (3–5 December 1999) 

Bob Maher, Jr. won Pro Tour Chicago playing a blue-green-white control deck. He defeated Brian Davis in the finals 3–2. First time Pro Tour attendant Davis reportedly played so horribly, that around spectators the joke went, that Davis was the first to have played 5–0 in the finals and lost, referring to their perception that he could and should have won every single game.

Tournament data 

Prize pool: $151,635
Players: 344
Format: Extended
Head Judge: Nat Fairbanks

Top 8

Final standings

Grand Prixs – Manila, Seattle, Madrid 

GP Manila (4–5 December)
 Christopher Parreñas
 Frederick Salazar
 Francis Robert Profeta
 Lawrence Lagman
 Au Yeung Hon Ming
 Andrew Buchanan
 Dino Eric Yu
 Ramon Allan Oca, Jr.

GP Seattle (15–16 January)
 Bob Maher, Jr.
 Jeremy Brower
 Tim Kariel
 David Price
 Alex Shvartsman
 Jasar Elarar
 Mike Hron
 David Weitz

GP Madrid (29–30 January)
 Carlos Barrado
 Xavi Gonzales
 Alex Shvartsman
 Tony Dobson
 Olivier Ruel
 Alex Dominguez Ramos
 Rui Mariani
 Patrick Mello

Pro Tour – Los Angeles (4–6 February 2000) 

Trevor Blackwell defeated Chris Benafel in the finals to become Pro Tour Los Angeles champion.

Tournament data 

Prize pool: $151,635
Players: 337
Format: Mercadian Masques Booster Draft (Mercadian Masques)
Head Judge: Dan Gray

Top 8

Final standings

Grand Prix – Taipei, Philadelphia, Cannes, Kuala Lumpur, Frankfurt 

GP Taipei (12–13 February)
 Tadayoshi Komiya
 Tsuyoshi Fujita
 Alex Shvartsman
 Jim Len
 Lucifar Sun
 Chi Jin Guo (Tzu-Ching Kuo)
 Satoshi Nakamura
 Tobey Tamber

GP Philadelphia (19–20 February)
 Trey Van Cleave
 Britt Fitch
 Scott McCord
 John Marks
 William Jensen
 David Roderer
 Brad Swan
 Michael Bernat

GP Cannes (26–27 February)
1. Black Ops
 Florent Jeudon
 Antoine Ruel
 Olivier Ruel
2. New Wave
 Alex Shvartsman
 Bram Snepvangers
 Thomas Preyer
3. Legion of Rabbits
 Nicolas Labarre
 Manuel Bevand
 Marie Laure Saulnier
4. The Tightans
 Daniel O'Mahoney-Schwartz
 William Jensen
 David Williams

GP Kuala Lumpur (4–5 March)
 Ryan Soh
 Tishen Tham
 Wai Kin Au Yong
 Tsuyoshi Ikeda
 Jun Nobushita
 Tsutomu Yamada
 Albertus Law
 Wei Ren Khoo

GP Frankfurt (8–9 April)
1. III Heroes
 Jim Herold
 Sebastian Moises
 Gunnar Refsdal
2. Hammer of Brno
 Martin Laznovsky
 Ivan Stanoev
 Libor Marek
3. Trash A
 Jakub Slemr
 Ondrej Baurys
 Tomas Kosicka
4. Absolute Samuels
 Daniel Steinsdorfer
 Demir Sejdiu
 Patrick Jansen

Pro Tour – New York (14–16 April 2000) 

Sigurd Eskeland won Pro Tour New York, defeating Warren Marsh in the finals. Eskeland played a blue control-deck with the centerpiece of the deck being . His opponent played the deck most present at this tournament, Rebels. PT New York is considered to be the first time where there was a dominant deck at a Pro Tour, the deck did not win the tournament.

43% of the players entering the tournament had chosen rebel decks. On the second day of the tournament rebels were even more present, comprising and unprecedented 57% of the field. These numbers were again topped by the final eight where six of eight decks were rebel decks. In contrast the winning Rising Waters deck comprised only 8.4% of the field on day one and 14.5% on day two. In the top eight the two non-rebel decks were both Rising Waters decks. Rising Waters on both days had the highest winning percentage of all decks played with 60% on day one and 53.8% on day two.

Tournament data 

Players: 310
Prize pool: $151,635
Format: Mercadian Masques Block Constructed (Mercadian Masques, Nemesis)
Location: New York State Armory
Head Judge: Cyril Grillon

Top 8

Final standings

Winner's deck 

Sigurd Eskeland played a blue control-deck with the centerpiece of the deck being .

Team Challenge 

The Team Challenge was a predecessor to the Masters Series events that were held from 2000 to 2003. These events were open only to the most accomplished players and awarded cash prizes even for entering the tournament. The Team Challenge at Pro Tour New York 2000 awarded $3,000 for entering the tournament, $9,000 to the runners-up team, and $15,000 to the winners. Four teams were invited to enter the tournament. In a field composed of otherwise American teams the French team Black Ops defeated Game Empire and Antarctica to win the tournament.

Grand Prixs – Nagoya, St. Louis, Copenhagen, Pittsburgh

GP Nagoya (22–23 April)
1. New Wave
 Alex Shvartsman
 Trevor Blackwell
 Nick Wong
2. Masato Club
 Goro Matsuo
 Jun Nobushita
 Tadayoshi Komiya
3. Godzilla
 Bob Maher, Jr.
 David Williams
 Mike Long
4. Unluckys
 Osamu Fujita
 Ayumi Hidaka
 Takayuki Nagaoka

GP Copenhagen (17–18 June)
 Niels Sanders Jensen
 Daniel O'Mahoney-Schwartz
 Franck Canu
 Noah Boeken
 Gottlieb Yeh
 Gunnar Refsdal
 Tom van de Logt
 Peter Gysemans

GP St. Louis (13–14 May)
1. Antarctica
 Daniel O'Mahoney-Schwartz
 Jon Finkel
 Steven O'Mahoney-Schwartz
2. Dogma
 Rob Liszka
 Mike Heffern
 Aaron Estrin
3. Your Move Games
 Darwin Kastle
 Rob Dougherty
 Dave Humpherys
4. Hubbo
 Ryan Carpenter
 Bryan Hubble
 Jason Opalka

GP Pittsburgh (24–25 June)
1. Huey, Ben, and Casey
 William Jensen
 Ben Rubin
 Casey McCarrel
2. Dark Side of the Moon
 Ray Tautic
 Brian Lynch
 Ben Halpren
3. Antarctica 
 Daniel O'Mahoney-Schwartz
 Steven O'Mahoney-Schwartz
 Jon Finkel
4. Your Move Games
 Darwin Kastle
 Rob Dougherty
 Dave Humpherys

2000 World Championships – Brussels (2–6 August 2000) 

Jon Finkel won the 2000 World Championship, defeating teammate Bob Maher, Jr. in the finals. The second place allowed Maher to take the Pro Player of the year title, surpassing Darwin Kastle in the final standings. Finkel became the second player to win two Pro Tours and the first with seven Top 8 appearances. The US team won the national team competition, also with Finkel as reigning national champion at its head.

Tournament data 

Prize pool: $201,620 (individual) + $50,000 (national teams)
Players: 273
Individual formats: Formats: Mercadian Masques Booster Draft (Mercadian Masques-Nemesis-Prophecy), Mercadian Masques Block Constructed (Mercadian Masques, Nemesis, Prophecy), Standard
Team Format: Standard
Head Judge: Cyril Grillon

Top 8

Final standings

National team competition 

 United States (Jon Finkel, Chris Benafel, Frank Hernandez, Aaron Forsythe)
 Canada (Ryan Fuller, Murray Evans, Gabriel Tsang, Sam Lau)

Pro Player of the year final standings 

After the World Championship Bob Maher, Jr. was awarded the Pro Player of the year title.

References 

Magic: The Gathering professional events